Prem Tinsulanonda International School is an EY1 - Grade 12 international boarding and day school for boys and girls aged 3 – 19. The school opened in August 2001 in Chiang Mai, Thailand and is a key part of the Traidhos Three-Generation Community for Learning, designed and created by Thai architect and artist, ML Tridhosyuth Devakul.  The school is on a 100-acre campus, and has approximately 500 students coming from over 31 countries.

The school is authorised by the International Baccalaureate Organisation (IB) Geneva, to offer the Diploma Program (IB DP) for grades 11 and 12, the Middle Years Program (IB MYP) for grades 6 - 10, and the Primary Years Program (IB PYP) for early years 1 to grade 5. Prem is the first school in Southeast Asia and the only one in Thailand to offer all four IB programs, as it also offers the IBCP – International Baccalaureate Career-related Program. The school is accredited by the Council of International Schools (CIS), the New England Association of Schools and Colleges (NEASC), and the Thai Ministry of Education. The school is a member of the International Schools Association of Thailand (ISAT), East Asian Regional Council of Schools (EARCOS) and the Boarding Schools Association (BSA). As of 2017, Prem has also officially joined a network of innovative schools in 50 countries in the Round Square organisation that share a passion for experiential learning built around six IDEALS of learning: Internationalism, Democracy, Environmentalism, Adventure, Leadership, and Service.

Location and facilities
The school is situated approximately 25 km north of the city of Chiang Mai in Mae Rim District. It caters to day students from Chiang Mai and boarders from all over the world. Its boarding program offers students academic support and cross-cultural experiences, as well as outdoor, leadership, creativity and sporting opportunities. There are a couple of boarding options available – weekly boarding and full boarding. The accommodation in boarding comprises cosy self-contained apartments.

The Traidhos community and the school campus includes the Artist Residency Thailand programme, a developmental residency programme that supports 'education for creativity' across the school. There is an extensive array of art and music facilities, an amphitheatre, an auditorium and a 'black box' drama studio Facilities also include six science laboratories, numerous sports fields, a full gymnasium, an Olympic-sized swimming pool complex, a cooking school, a chemical-free farm, and a well-equipped library. Specialised sports training in golf, football, cricket, and tennis are also available.

Cricket Ground

Namesake
The school was named in honour of General Prem Tinsulanonda, the Thai military officer, statesman and Prime Minister of Thailand from 1980 to 1988. He served as President of the Privy Council and as an advisor to the King Bhumibol Adulyadej.

External links
 Traidhos Three-Generation Community for Learning
 Traidhos Camps
 Prem Golf Centre
 Prem Tennis Centre
 Three-Generation Cricket Academy
 Three-Generation Cooking and Farm Academy
 Visiting Schools Program
 Barge Program
 Traidhos Residence
 Premburi

References

International Baccalaureate schools in Thailand
Boarding schools in Thailand
Private schools in Thailand
International schools in Chiang Mai
Educational institutions established in 2001
2001 establishments in Thailand